VDL Berkhof was a Netherlands based bus and coach builder, founded in 1970 by Arthur Berkhof and his son Henk. It started with only 10 employees in a 1,000 m² factory. During the first 18 months the company only carried out bus repairs. 
 
In 1985, the operation moved to a brand new 10,000 m² facility in Valkenswaard. The number of employees was now 132. The factory expanded in 1989 by an additional 10,000 m² resulting in a production capacity of 350 units a year following the acquisition of Hainje.

In 1994 Belgium bus and coach manufacturer Jonckheere with a total sales of 400 units per year and 500 employees, was acquired. The total staff number of employees of the Berkhof Groep now reached 1,200.

In 1997, the company changed its name from Berkhof Groep to Berkhof Jonckheere Groep. In 1998 it was bought by the VDL Groep and in 2010 was subsumed by VDL Bus & Coach.

The company has also built low-floor articulated trolleybuses for Arnhem in the Netherlands, and Solingen in Germany.

Former models
Ambassador
 Axial 50
 Axial 70
 Axial 100 DD
 Eclipse
 Excellence 500
 Excellence 1000
 Excellence 2000 HL / HLE
 Excellence 3000

References

External links
 
VDL Berkhof official website

Companies based in North Brabant
Trolleybus manufacturers
VDL Groep
Vehicle manufacturing companies established in 1970
2010 disestablishments in the Netherlands
Electric vehicle manufacturers of the Netherlands
Dutch companies established in 1970